Edmund Hornby (1773-1857) of Dalton Hall near Burton, Westmorland, was a Member of Parliament for , Lancashire, from 1812 to 1826. He was a nephew and son-in-law of Edward Smith-Stanley, 13th Earl of Derby (1775-1851).

Origins
He was the eldest son and heir of Rev. Geoffrey Hornby (1750-1812), of Scale Hall, near Lancaster in Lancashire, High Sheriff of Lancashire in 1774 and a Deputy Lieutenant of Lancashire, Colonel of a regiment of Lancashire militia, by his wife Lucy Smith-Stanley (d.1833) a daughter of James Smith-Stanley, Lord Strange (1716–1771), (son and heir apparent of Edward Stanley, 11th Earl of Derby (1689-1776) of Knowsley Hall in Lancashire) and a sister of Edward Smith-Stanley, 12th Earl of Derby (1752-1834). Edmund's sister Charlotte Margaret Hornby (d.1817) married her first cousin Edward Smith-Stanley, 13th Earl of Derby  (1775-1851), KG, and was the mother of Edward Smith-Stanley, 14th Earl of Derby (1799-1869), thrice Prime Minister of the United Kingdom (1852, 1858–9, 1866–8), thus Edmund's nephew. One of Edmund's younger brothers was Admiral Sir Phipps Hornby (1785-1867).

Marriage and children
He married his first cousin Lady Charlotte Stanley (d.1805), a daughter of Edward Smith-Stanley, 12th Earl of Derby (1752-1834), by whom he had issue including:
Edmund George Hornby (1799-1865) of Dalton Hall, eldest son and heir, a Member of Parliament for Warrington and Constable of Lancaster Castle.

References

1773 births
1857 deaths
Members of the Parliament of the United Kingdom for English constituencies
UK MPs 1812–1818
UK MPs 1818–1820
UK MPs 1820–1826